Noviye Sily (New Forces) was a daily Trudovik newspaper published in St. Petersburg, Russia, from March 1, 1907; nine issues appeared. The newspaper was banned on March 12, 1907.

References

Newspapers published in the Russian Empire
Mass media in Saint Petersburg